Jonquière is a provincial electoral district in the Saguenay–Lac-Saint-Jean region of Quebec, Canada that elects members to the National Assembly of Quebec.  It is located within the city of Saguenay and consists of most of the borough of Jonquière.

It was created for the 1966 election from parts of Jonquière-Kénogami and Lac-Saint-Jean electoral districts.

In the change from the 2001 to the 2011 electoral map, it lost a small amount of territory to Dubuc.

Members of the Legislative Assembly / National Assembly

Election results

|-
 
|Liberal
|Martine Girard
|align="right"|10,367
|align="right"|37.67
|align="right"|

|}

References

External links
Information
 Elections Quebec

Election results
 Election results (National Assembly)
 Election results (Elections Quebec)

Maps
 2011 map (PDF)
 2001 map (Flash)
2001–2011 changes (Flash)
1992–2001 changes (Flash)
 Electoral map of Saguenay–Lac-Saint-Jean region
 Quebec electoral map, 2011

Quebec provincial electoral districts
Politics of Saguenay, Quebec